Ben Thomas (born 25 November 1998) is a Welsh rugby union player who plays for Cardiff Rugby as a centre. He was a Wales under-20 international.

Thomas made his debut for Cardiff in 2019 having previously played for the Cardiff academy. Despite developing as a 10, Thomas switched to inside centre ahead of the 2018/19 season. Following a successful transition, Thomas was named Best Newcomer in the Premiership after helping Cardiff RFC claim the National Cup, the club's first silverware since 2009.

On June 7, 2021, Thomas received his first call up for the senior Wales team for the 2021 Summer Internationals, replacing Callum Sheedy at fly-half in the second half of the match against Canada to win his first cap.

Personal life 
Thomas is the son of British light-middleweight boxing champion Pat Thomas

References

External links 
Cardiff Rugby profile
itsrugby.co.uk Profile

1998 births
Living people
Cardiff Rugby players
Rugby union centres
Rugby union players from Cardiff
Welsh rugby union players
Rugby union fly-halves
Wales international rugby union players